Dehydrogenase/reductase SDR family member 2 is an enzyme that in humans is encoded by the DHRS2 gene.

References

Further reading

External links